Ising is a surname. Notable people with the surname include:

 Ernst Ising (1900–1998), German physicist
 Gustav Ising (1883–1960), Swedish accelerator physicist
 Rudolf Ising, animator for MGM, together with Hugh Harman often credited as: Harman-Ising

See also
 Ising model, mathematical model of ferromagnetism in statistical mechanics